was the governor of Gunma Prefecture in Japan. He was first elected in 2007 after serving in the assembly of Gunma Prefecture.

References

Sources

External links
  

Keio University alumni
People from Ōta, Gunma
1946 births
Living people
Governors of Gunma Prefecture